Analog Future (stylised as ANALOG_FUTURE) is the first live album by Australian heavy metal band Northlane. It was released on 16 March 2018 through UNFD. It was recorded between August–December 2017, during their Mesmer World Tour.

The album had a limited edition vinyl release of only 500 copies.

Background and promotion
The first and only single from the live album, "Citizen (Live in Melbourne)", was recorded on 20 October 2017 and released on 6 February 2018.

On 13 February, Northlane announced the track listing of the album.

About the album, the band said: "Since Northlane was born, we have never been able to capture the rawness, energy and sound of our live show in a recording, until now." Coinciding with the live album's release, Northlane returned to their hometown for an all-ages headline show at UNSW Roundhouse in Sydney. Justice for the Damned, Resist the Thought and DVSR played as support acts. The guitarist Josh Smith said that the Sydney show would be the band's last Australian appearance for the foreseeable future. Afterwards, apart from some festival appearances, the band took a break from touring all together until August the following year to promote their fifth studio album, Alien.

Track listing
Track listing adapted from Spotify.

Personnel
Northlane
 Marcus Bridge – lead vocals
 Jon Deiley – lead guitar, programming, drum pad
 Josh Smith – rhythm guitar
 Alex Milovic – bass
 Nic Pettersen – drums, percussion

Additional personnel
 Jared Daly – mixing
 Chris Blancato – mastering
 GZ Media – vinyl pressing

References

2018 live albums
Northlane live albums
UNFD albums